Sviniste is an abandoned village in the Bitola Municipality of North Macedonia. It used to be part of the former municipality of Capari.

Demographics
According to the 2002 census, the village had a total of 0 inhabitants.

References

External links
 Visit Macedonia

Villages in Bitola Municipality